The Girl and the Gambler is a 1939 Western film, from RKO Radio Pictures, starring Tim Holt. It was an early starring Western for Holt, who soon replaced George O'Brien as the studio's main Western star.

The film was based on a play which had been filmed by RKO in 1932 as Girl of the Rio.

It was originally called The Dove.

Cast
 Tim Holt as Johnny Powell
 Leo Carrillo as El Rayo
 Steffi Duna as Dolores "The Dove" Romero
 Esther Muir as Madge
 Paul Fix as Charlie
 Donald MacBride as Mike Bascom

Reception
The New York Times called it "a dead duck".

See also
 The Dove (1927)

References

External list

1939 films
1939 Western (genre) films
American Western (genre) films
RKO Pictures films
American black-and-white films
Films produced by Cliff Reid
Films directed by Lew Landers
American films based on plays
Remakes of American films
1930s American films